The Someshwara Temple is located in Agara, on Sarjapura main road in Bangalore, Karnataka, India.The Co-Ordinates of this temple are:- 12°55'5"N 77°37'6"E. It is dedicated to the Deity Someshwara (the Hindu God Shiva) and dates back to the Chola period. The temple has a history of 1,200 years.

References 

Chola architecture
9th-century Hindu temples
Hindu temples in Bangalore
Shiva temples in Karnataka